Lake Lemuria (Pink Lake) (Ukrainian: Лемурійське озеро) is a small lake in the western part of Syvash Bay in the Kherson region of Ukraine. Lake Lemuria is a healing resort of international importance.

The salinity of the lake water reaches 270 - 300 grams of salt per liter of water.

History 
The origins of the lake are disputed. According to one theory, on August 26, 1969, a Soviet bomber crashed on the shores of Syvash. Rescuers allegedly breached salty aquifers while digging to a depth of 18 meters to collect the remains of the bomber. The lake was later formed when underground water filled the excavation. Residents of the surrounding villages named the lake "Yama" and often went for a swim for fun. After some time, stories about the healing properties of the salt water of the lake began to spread. This allowed starting the development of green tourism in this region. Supporters of Helena Blavatsky's esoteric ideas named the lake, as a reference to the mythical continent Lemuria.

Color 
The pink color of the reservoir is due to the action of unicellular algae Dunaliella saline, which under the action of the sun produce beta-carotene. The hotter the summer, the more water evaporates from the lake and the brine gets a more saturated color. While retreating, the water leaves a large amount of salt crystals on the shore. In places, salt crystals get lost, forming "stalagmites". The white shore and the pink lake give this part of Kherson region a very distinctive appearance.

Application 
The mud of this lake was certified in 2005 and approved for use as a therapeutic and cosmetic product. The mud of the lake is included in the program of insurance medicine in Germany.

References 

Lakes of Ukraine
Geography of Kherson Oblast